Kim Louise Pickering is a New Zealand composite materials engineer. She is currently a full professor at the University of Waikato.

Academic career

After a BSc(ENG) at Imperial College London, three years at Plessey Research Caswell and a PhD at the University of Surrey, Pickering started working at the University of Waikato in 1994 and rose to full professor in 2014.

Much of Pickering's research involves 3D printing of "recyclable, biodegradable and bio-derived composite materials" and she has been a major proponent of recycling.

In 2017 she won the RJ Scott Medal from the Royal Society of New Zealand. Also in 2017, Pickering was selected as one of the Royal Society Te Apārangi's "150 women in 150 words", celebrating the contributions of women to knowledge in New Zealand.

Selected works

References

External links
  
 

Living people
New Zealand women academics
New Zealand engineers
New Zealand women engineers
Alumni of Imperial College London
Academic staff of the University of Waikato
21st-century women engineers
Year of birth missing (living people)